Rudravaram may refer to:

Somavaram, Nandigama mandal, a village in Nandigama mandal of Krishna district, Andhra Pradesh
Somavaram, Chatrai mandal, a village in Chatrai mandal of Krishna district, Andhra Pradesh